Nuneaton and Bedworth is a local government district with borough status, in northern Warwickshire, England, consisting of the towns of Nuneaton and Bedworth, the large village of Bulkington and the green belt land inbetween. It had a population of 129,883 at a 2019-estimate.

It borders the Warwickshire districts of Rugby to the east, and North Warwickshire to the west. To the south, it borders the city of Coventry in the West Midlands county, and to the north the Hinckley and Bosworth district of Leicestershire.

The borough is governed by the Nuneaton and Bedworth Borough Council.  As of the most recent local election, the council is under Conservative Control.

History

The Nuneaton and Bedworth district was created on 1 April 1974 by the Local Government Act 1972. It was from the merger of the Municipal Borough of Nuneaton, a municipal borough, and Bedworth Urban District, an urban district which included Bulkington. The new district was originally named just "Nuneaton"; however, objections from Bedworth residents led to it being renamed "Nuneaton and Bedworth" in 1980.
Nuneaton had gained the status of a municipal borough in 1907, and Bedworth had gained the status of an urban district in 1928. In 1938, Bulkington became part of the Bedworth Urban District. Borough status was conferred upon the new district of Nuneaton and Bedworth on 15 November 1976.

In 2008, after 34 years of Labour Party control, the ruling Labour council lost to the Conservative Party, who gained the four seats needed to gain control; the BNP also gained two seats on the new council (their first ever seats in the borough), but lost one seat to the Labour Party in a by-election held in December 2009. The Labour Party won two seats from the Conservative Party in the 2010 local elections, leaving the council under no overall control, but led by the Labour group (as the largest party). The 2012 local election saw Labour regain majority control of the council. Labour maintained majority control after the 2014 local election.

Subdivisions

Nuneaton and Bedworth are divided into 17 wards, each represented by 2 councillors, giving a total of 34 councillors. The borough has no civil parishes.

For a sortable list of wards in Nuneaton and Bedworth by population, see List of wards in Nuneaton and Bedworth by population.

Council composition 

For past results, see Nuneaton and Bedworth Borough Council elections.

Following the 2022 Nuneaton and Bedworth Borough Council election, the composition of the council is shown below. Currently the borough has a Conservative administration led by Kris Wilson.

Twinnings

Nuneaton and Bedworth is twinned with: 
 Roanne, France
 Guadalajara, Castile-La Mancha, Spain
 Cottbus, Germany

References

External links
The Nuneaton Local History Group
Nuneaton and Bedworth Borough Council
Election Results

 
Non-metropolitan districts of Warwickshire
Boroughs in England